Ranjan Baindoor (28 January 1950 – 4 April 2016) was an Indian cricketer. He played sixteen first-class matches for Mumbai between 1974 and 1985.

References

External links
 

1950 births
2016 deaths
Indian cricketers
Mumbai cricketers
Cricketers from Mumbai